The Peleg Champlin House is an historic house on Rodman Pond Lane in western New Shoreham, on Block Island, in Rhode Island.  It is a -story wood-frame structure, five bays wide, with a side-gable roof and a large central chimney.  An ell extends from the back (north) side of the house.  The Federal style wooden house was built c. 1820 by Peleg Champlin, a farmer from one of the island's older families.  The house is one of the best-preserved houses of the period on the island.

The residence was added to the National Historic Register in 1982, after a campaign led by Ronald Reagan.

See also
National Register of Historic Places listings in Washington County, Rhode Island

References

Houses completed in 1820
New Shoreham, Rhode Island
Houses on the National Register of Historic Places in Rhode Island
Houses in Washington County, Rhode Island
Federal architecture in Rhode Island
National Register of Historic Places in Washington County, Rhode Island